was a small locality located northeast of Burgeo.

See also
 List of ghost towns in Newfoundland and Labrador

Ghost towns in Newfoundland and Labrador